SBMT may refer to:

Acronyms

 Campo de Marte Airport's ICAO code
 Society for Brain Mapping and Therapeutics
 South Bay Musical Theatre
 South Brooklyn Marine Terminal
 Software Based Modeling Tool (as said in Agile software development)